Augusto Colombo (1902 in Milan – 1969) was an Italian painter.

After attending the school of arts and crafts run by the Società Umanitaria in Milan, Colombo enrolled at the Brera Academy for the evening classes taught by Giuseppe Palanti and then Ambrogio Alciati’s course of nude studies. He was awarded the Cesare Sarfatti Prize in 1924, which enabled him to spend the next two years in Rome, Florence and Paris. Having returned to Milan, he took part in the city’s exhibitions with portraits and large-scale compositions on social and religious subjects. The art school he opened in his studio in 1933 was to have over 800 pupils during its 36 years of operation. A militant antifascist, he depicted the horrors of war in a series of works during World War II and subsequently played a leading role in Milan’s cultural life, founding the magazine Valori and promoting the activities of the Famiglia Meneghina organisation. The large-scale compositions on religious subjects were combined in later years with numerous cycles of decorative works.

Gallery

References
 Laura Casone, Augusto Colombo, online catalogue Artgate by Fondazione Cariplo, 2010, CC BY-SA (source for the first revision of this article).

Other projects

20th-century Italian painters
20th-century Italian male artists
Italian male painters
Painters from Milan
Brera Academy alumni
1902 births
1969 deaths